The Braindance Coincidence is a 2001 compilation album released by Rephlex Records.

Background
Rephlex Records was founded in 1991 by Richard D. James (Aphex Twin) and Grant Wilson-Claridge. They coined the term "braindance", which was described by Wilson-Claridge as "a way of life" rather than a musical style. The record label launched the careers of µ-Ziq, Luke Vibert, and Squarepusher; introduced Mike Dred, Cylob, and DMX Krew; and revived material from 808 State and Baby Ford. To celebrate the 10th anniversary and over 100 releases, Rephlex Records released a 16-track compilation album of back catalog releases, titled The Braindance Coincidence, in 2001.

Critical reception
Glenn Swan of AllMusic gave the album 4.5 stars out of 5, describing it as "stellar in scope, richly diverse, and a smart starting point for the curious." Rod Smith of City Pages said, "Although the songs are more low-budget than lo-fi, the home-studio sound celebrates Rephlex's pre-Powerbook, analog origins." Matt Corwine of Seattle Weekly commented that "they all share the laid back, low-fidelity aesthetic of the geeky, reclusive personalities that made them and the bedroom studios in which they were recorded." Nicolae White of The Stranger called it "a great starting point to see what's going on in the world of experimental electronic music."

Track listing

References

External links
 
 

2001 compilation albums
Rephlex Records compilation albums
Record label compilation albums
Electronic compilation albums